Idumbe Airport  is an airstrip serving the hamlet of Idumbe in Kasaï Province, Democratic Republic of the Congo.

See also

 Transport in the Democratic Republic of the Congo
 List of airports in the Democratic Republic of the Congo

References

External links
 OpenStreetMap - Idumbe
 FallingRain - Idumbe Airport
 OurAirports - Idumbe Airport
 

Airports in Kasaï Province